Poirt an Phiobaire is a 1983 solo release by uillean piper and whistle player Paddy Keenan.

Tracks

Musicians
Paddy Keenan : Uilleann Pipes, Tin Whistle
Arty McGlynn : Guitar

References

External links
Paddy Keenan official site

1983 albums